Paul Taylor (born 19 June 1988) is a Welsh international lawn bowler.

Bowls career
He competed for Wales in the men's triples at the 2014 Commonwealth Games where he won a bronze medal with Jonathan Tomlinson and Marc Wyatt. In 2015 he won the triples silver medal and fours bronze medal at the Atlantic Bowls Championships.

Taylor has won five Welsh National Bowls Championships outdoor titles (2005 under 18 singles, 2009 fours, 2011 under 25 singles, 2013 & 2016 triples) and finished runner four times (2006 Under 18 Singles, 2010 pairs, 2012 singles and 2021 triples. In addition he has won the 2012 Tiger Fours Invitational and the under 25 Singles and triples at the British Isles Championships. Furthermore, he won the Carruthers Shield Welsh Club Championship with Ely Valley in 2016.

He bowls for Ely Valley after previously winning national titles with Bridgend BC and Pontycymmer BC. In 2021, he finished runner-up in the men's triples at the 2021 Welsh National Bowls Championships.

References

1988 births
Living people
Bowls players at the 2014 Commonwealth Games
Commonwealth Games bronze medallists for Wales
Welsh male bowls players
Commonwealth Games medallists in lawn bowls
Medallists at the 2014 Commonwealth Games